is a Japanese voice actress from Hyōgo Prefecture. She is represented by the talent agency Sigma Seven.

Filmography

Television animation
Chibi Devi! (2011), Shiori
Hanasaku Iroha (2011), Mai
Arashi no Yoru ni (2012), Young white goat
Battle Spirits: Sword Eyes (2012), Yamabuki
Bodacious Space Pirates (2012), Ursula Abramov
Ebiten (2012), Hakata Kanamori
High School DxD (2012), Ravel Phoenix
Sengoku Collection (2012), Gentleman Bashou Matsuo
Battle Spirits: Sword Eyes Gekitōden (2013), Yamabuki, Waitress - ep 1
Kin-iro Mosaic (2013), Shinobu Ōmiya
Problem Children Are Coming from Another World, Aren't They? (2013), Calico Cat
Straight Title Robot Anime (2013), Fujii
Tesagure! Bukatsu-mono (2013), Yua Suzuki
The Devil Is a Part-Timer! (2013), Rika Suzuki
Unbreakable Machine-Doll (2013), Henriette Belew
Yozakura Quartet (2013), Midoriko
47 Todō Fuken R (2014), Hyōgo Dog
Bladedance of Elementalers (2014), Shareiria
Dai-Shogun - Great Revolution (2014), Sakuragi
Maken-ki! 2 (2014), Monji
Sakura Trick (2014), Shinobu Noda
Selector Infected Wixoss (2014), Yūko
Tesagure! Bukatsu-mono Encore (2014), Yua Suzuki
The Irregular at Magic High School (2014), Eimi Akechi
Gourmet Girl Graffiti (2015), Misaki Yoneya
High School DxD BorN (2015), Ravel Phoenix
Is It Wrong to Try to Pick Up Girls in a Dungeon? (2015), Anya
Hello!! Kin-iro Mosaic (2015), Shinobu Ōmiya
Mikagura School Suite (2015), Yuriko
Suzakinishi the Animation (2015), Asuka Nishi
Tesagure! Bukatsu-mono: Spin-off Puru Purun Sharumu to Asobō (2015), Yua Suzuki
Gate: Jieitai Kano Chi nite, Kaku Tatakaeri (2016), Meya
Go! Princess PreCure (2016), Kotori
Mahō Shōjo Nante Mō Ii Desu Kara. (2016), Pochi
Magical Girl Raising Project (2016), Tama
Three Leaves, Three Colors (2016), Kō Hayama
Black Clover (2017), Mimosa Vermilion
High School DxD Hero (2018), Ravel Phoenix
Endro! (2019), Chibi Dragon
Star Twinkle PreCure (2019), Yanyan 
Magia Record (2020), Meiyui Chun (Ep.6)
The 8th Son? Are You Kidding Me? (2020), Elize
Redo of Healer (2021), Anna
Scarlet Nexus (2021), Naomi Randall
The Honor Student at Magic High School (2021), Eimi Akechi
Seirei Gensouki: Spirit Chronicles (2021), Alma
The Devil Is a Part-Timer!! (2022), Rika Suzuki

Original video animation (OVA)
Problem Children Are Coming from Another World, Aren't They? (2013), Female Guest
High School DxD BorN (2015), Ravel Phoenix

Theatrical animation
Death Billiards (2013), Female Patron
Bodacious Space Pirates: Abyss of Hyperspace (2014), Ursula Abramov
Kin-iro Mosaic: Thank You!! (2021), Shinobu Ōmiya

Video games
Koi Q Bu! (2014), Megumi Tsutsui
The Irregular at Magic High School Out of Order (2014), Eimi Akechi
Idol Incidents (2015), Aina Kingetsu
Idol Paradise (2015), Ange Tears
Rage of Bahamut (2015), Pine
Moero Crystal (2015), Lulucie
Idol Death Game TV (2016), Rito Karasuma
Magia Record (2017), Meiyui Chun
Azur Lane (2020), HMS Valiant
Livestream: Escape from Hotel Izanami (2021), Nana Sakurai
Massage Freaks (2022), Mei Amamiya

Web anime
Starry Sky (2010), Kindergarten Pupil

Other
Windows 8 Pro DSP, Madobe Yū

Discography

Singles

References

External links

 Official website 
 Official agency profile  
 

1988 births
Living people
Voice actresses from Hyōgo Prefecture
Japanese video game actresses
Japanese voice actresses
Sigma Seven voice actors